Louis Yaeger (February 1, 1899 – May 11, 1981) was an Austrian-American investor who made a fortune during the bull market of the 1950s.

Biography

Yaeger was born in Austria and arrived in the U.S. in 1905. His native language was Yiddish. He graduated Phi Beta Kappa from Columbia University in 1921 having studied business and finance. He worked as an accountant and subsequently became  an auditing agent for the IRS. He left in 1923 and went to work as a bond salesman in New York City, eventually becoming an investment counselor.

In the 1940s, Yaeger gave up his investment consulting business and focused on his own account. Yaeger dealt with several brokerage firms in New York including H. Hentz & Co, his account was at one point the largest that firm had maintained for a US citizen.

He died in Palm Beach, Florida.

See also
Value investing

References

1981 deaths
American investors
American money managers
Columbia Business School alumni
1899 births
Austro-Hungarian emigrants to the United States
American Jews